is a military aerodrome of the Japan Ground Self-Defense Force ,  south of Tsuchiura in Ibaraki Prefecture, Japan.

History
The base was established in 1921 as the Imperial Japanese Navy Aeronautical Technology and Training Center (海軍航空技術講習所). After the First World War Japan, which had fought with the allies, received the German airship hangar from Jüterbog airbase as part of its war reparations, and the hangar was installed at Kasumigaura air base. On 19 August 1929, the airship LZ 127 Graf Zeppelin stopped at Kasumigaura for several days while on its round-the-world trip. The Zeppelin visit made Tsuchiura famous throughout Japan for its potato-based curry.

The IJN ordered an Astra-Torres airship from France in 1922 and stationed it at Kasumigaura from 1923, alongside a Japanese-built Vickers SS-3; both of these airships left service around 1924. Kasumigaura later hosted three Fujikura airships and one Nobile airship between 1927 and 1932, at which point the Navy ceased airship operations and dismantled its fleet.

The U.S. military took over the base in 1945 and handed it over to the Japanese defense ministry in 1953. Since then it has been used as a supply depot and as a training base for helicopter pilots and mechanics, with approximately 2,000 personnel stationed on base.

References

Airports in Japan
Transport in Ibaraki Prefecture
Japan Ground Self-Defense Force bases
Buildings and structures in Ibaraki Prefecture
Ami, Ibaraki